Langsdorfia is a genus of moths in the family Cossidae.

Species
 Langsdorfia adornata Dognin, 1889
 Langsdorfia albescens Ureta, 1957
 Langsdorfia andensis Felder, 1874
 Langsdorfia argentata Köhler, 1924
 Langsdorfia beatrix Schaus, 1921
 Langsdorfia bellaria Dognin, 1911
 Langsdorfia buckleyi Druce, 1901
 Langsdorfia coresa Schaus, 1901
 Langsdorfia dukinfieldi Schaus, 1894
 Langsdorfia forreri Druce, 1887
 Langsdorfia franckii Hübner, 1824
 Langsdorfia garleppi Staudinger
 Langsdorfia invetita Dognin, 1923
 Langsdorfia leucrocraspedontis Zukowsky, 1954
 Langsdorfia malina Dognin, 1891
 Langsdorfia marmorata Maasen, 1890
 Langsdorfia metana Dognin, 1910
 Langsdorfia minima Dognin, 1891
 Langsdorfia ornatus Butler, 1882
 Langsdorfia pallida Druce, 1911
 Langsdorfia penai Clench, 1957
 Langsdorfia rufescens Druce, 1901
 Langsdorfia sieglinda Schaus, 1934
 Langsdorfia tessellata E. D. Jones, 1912
 Langsdorfia xylodopoecila Zukowsky, 1954

Former species
 Langsdorfia aroa Schaus, 1894
 Langsdorfia polybia Schaus, 1892

References

External links
Natural History Museum Lepidoptera generic names catalog

Hypoptinae
Cossidae genera